Xinyi is a county-level city under the administration of Xuzhou, Jiangsu province, China. It borders the prefecture-level cities of Linyi (Shandong) to the north, Lianyungang to the northeast, and Suqian to the east and south.

History 
The archaeological site of Huating, located in the southwestern part, was inhabited as long as 5,000 years ago. During the Zhou dynasty, its southern territory was dominated by a minor state: Zhongwu, which was variously annexed to Wu, Yue and Chu. Two counties designated Siwu and Jianlin were established in its southern part and northern part in the West Han, both counties were dissolved during the Southern and Northern dynasties, and the major region was administrated by Suqian. The borders among then Suqian, Shuyang, Donghai along with Pizhou were merged and became a separated county in 1949. It named after the seat, Xin'an town, but was renamed Xinyi, a river flowing through its area, in 1952, because of its namesake in Henan. The county was converted to a county-level city in 1990.

Administrative divisions
In the present, Xinyi City has 16 towns.
16 towns

Climate

Transport
Xinyi is a railway junction on the Longhai Railway.  It is the southern terminus of the Jiaozhou–Xinyi railway and the northern terminus of the Xinyi-Changxing Railway.

Sister Cities
 Trumbull, Connecticut since 1996

References

Citations

Sources 

 
www.xzqh.org 

County-level divisions of Jiangsu
Cities in Jiangsu
Administrative divisions of Xuzhou